Northwest Local Schools is a school district located in Stark County, Ohio. The district enrolls students from City of Canal Fulton, Village of Clinton (Summit County), Lawrence Township and Franklin Township.

Schools 

 Northwest Primary School (K-2)
 W.S. Stinson Upper Elementary School (3-5) 
 Northwest Middle School (6-8)
 Northwest High School (9-12)

External links
 District website

School districts in Stark County, Ohio